This is chronological list of avant-garde and experimental films split by decade. Often there may be considerable overlap particularly between avant-garde/experimental and other genres (including, documentaries, fantasy, and science fiction films); the list should attempt to document films which are more closely related to the avant-garde, even if it bends genres.

List by decade
 List of avant-garde films before 1930
 List of avant-garde films of the 1930s
 List of avant-garde films of the 1940s
 List of avant-garde films of the 1950s
 List of avant-garde films of the 1960s: 1960–1964
 List of avant-garde films of the 1960s: 1965–1969
 List of avant-garde films of the 1970s
 List of avant-garde films of the 1980s
 List of avant-garde films of the 1990s
 List of avant-garde films of the 2000s
 List of avant-garde films of the 2010s
 List of avant-garde films of the 2020s

Lists of films by genre